The 2021–22 Western Carolina Catamounts men's basketball team represented Western Carolina University in the 2021–22 NCAA Division I men's basketball season. The Catamounts, led by first-year head coach Justin Gray, played their home games at the Ramsey Center in Cullowhee, North Carolina, as members of the Southern Conference. They finished the season 11–21, 5–13 in SoCon play to finish in last place. They lost to Mercer in the first round of the SoCon tournament.

Previous season
In a season limited due to the ongoing COVID-19 pandemic, the Catamounts finished the 2019–20 season 11–16, 4–13 in SoCon play to finish in ninth place. They lost in the first round of the SoCon tournament to The Citadel.

Offseason

Player departures

Incoming transfers

2021 recruiting class

Roster

Schedule and results

|-
!colspan=12 style=| Exhibition

|-
!colspan=12 style=| Non-conference Regular season

|-
!colspan=12 style=| SoCon Regular season

|-
!colspan=12 style=| SoCon tournament
|-

|-

Source

References

Western Carolina Catamounts men's basketball seasons
Western Carolina Catamounts
Western Carolina Catamounts men's basketball
Western Carolina Catamounts men's basketball